Bite the bullet is Sledgeback's third full-length album. 
The sound of the album is general punk rock. The album contains 13 tracks. There are twelve songs on the album. The thirteenth track is an edited version of the opening song, Palinka.

Basic information
Bite the bullet is the third full-length album of the 
Seattle rock band Sledgeback. Released by Sliver records in November 
2010. This is the first album of the group that has been flagged as 
explicit content (by iTunes) because of the opening song "Palinka" 
contains foul language. ("Palinka" is an alcoholic beverage)

Track listing
Palinka 2:54
Dead city 2:55
Insane 2:02
A mile away 2:33
No man's land 2:51
Beer 3:04
Scarheart 3:17
Dead boy dead girl 3:28
Hey (Heidi) ho 2:36
Falling down 3:10
Wasted gang 2:45
Don't look down on me 3:39
Palinka (Radio edit) 2:52

Other
Track #5 "No mans land" and track #9 "Hey ho" released on the split album "Reality bites" in 2010.
Track #13 is the "radio edit" of track #1 "Palinka". The band placed this version on the album without the explicit content that appears in the original lyric of the song.

References

Reviews
Disagreement magazine
Nostalgia for Infinity review
Sparkplug magazine (Los Angeles) review
The Punksite.com review

External links
Bite the bullet on iTunes
Bite the bullet on CDBaby
Bite the bullet on Last FM

Sledgeback albums
2010 albums